The Park Valley of Arizona is a small, northwest by southeast trending valley centered on the Gila River in central-east Yuma County. The southeast border of the valley is the northern Sentinel Plain of Maricopa County which drains northwestwards toward the Gila River Valley.

Interstate 8 is on the south perimeter of the valley, with towns on I-8 of Dateland in the southwest, Aztec on the center-south, and further east, Sentinel on the southeast.

Tenmile Wash, of the Tenmile Wash Watershed has its outfall on the Gila River on the southwest of Park Valley. The coordinates for Dateland, Arizona, on the southwest border of Park Valley are

See also
 List of valleys of Arizona

References

External links
 Tenmile Wash Watershed Map

Gila River
Valleys of Arizona
Landforms of Yuma County, Arizona
River valleys of the United States